Max Evans (16 May 1923 – 25 September 2006) was an Australian rules footballer who played with Richmond in the Victorian Football League (VFL).

Evans played beside his elder brother Ron at Richmond in 1947 and 1948, after coming to the club from Richmond United.

He left Richmond for South Warrnambool in 1949 and won the Maskell Medal in his first year.

References

1923 births
Australian rules footballers from Victoria (Australia)
Richmond Football Club players
South Warrnambool Football Club players
2006 deaths